Krzysztof Ibisz (born 25 February 1965 in Warsaw) is a Polish game show host and television personality. He was a member of Polish Beer-Lovers' Party and a Deputy in the Polish Sejm from 1991–93.

He hosted the following Polish game shows (among other programs):
 Czar par (1993–1996)
 Życiowa szansa (2000–2002)
 Awantura o kasę (2002–2005)
 Rosyjska ruletka (2003–2004)
 Gra w ciemno (2005–2007)
 Gdzie jest Kłamczuch? (2008–2009)
 Dancing with the Stars. Taniec z gwiazdami (2014–)
 Joker (2017–2018)
 Łowcy Nagród (2020–)

External links

References 

Polish game show hosts
Living people
Polish television personalities
Polish television journalists
Polish film actors
Polish male voice actors
Politicians from Warsaw
1965 births
Łódź Film School alumni